Agrippina Fedorovna Chelyadnina (fl. 1538), was a Russian noble and courtier, the royal governess of Tsar Ivan the Terrible.

Agrippina was the daughter of Fyodor Vasilyevich Obolensky (called Telepen), and sister of Ivan Fedorovich Telepnev-Obolensky who was a favourite of Elena Glinskaya.

She married a Boyar in the service of Vasili III of Moscow. The marriage was childless, as Fydor died between 1516 and 1518. Due to the status of her husband and relitives, Agrippina enjoyed an elite position amongst other courtiers. She was appointed governess to Ivan in 1533, before Vasili's death, after which Elena took Agrippina's brother as her lover and ruled as regent.

After the death of Elena Glinskaya, 20 April 1838, boyars Ivan and Vasili Shuisky staged a coup, arresting Agrippina and her brother. She was exiled to Kargopol forced to become a nun.

References

16th-century Eastern Orthodox nuns
People of the Grand Duchy of Moscow
16th-century Russian people
Russian courtiers
16th-century Russian women
Governesses to the Imperial Russian court